Where the Legend Begins is a 2002 Hong Kong television series produced by TVB. The series is based on the life story of Zhen Fu (Cantonese: Yan Fuk), a noble lady who lived during the Three Kingdoms period. It contains embellishments from folktales about Yan's romance with Cao Pi (Cantonese: Cho Pei) and Cao Zhi (Cantonese: Cho Chik). The series was first aired in Hong Kong on TVB Jade from 24 June to 26 July in 2002.

Cast
 Note: Some of the characters' names are in Cantonese romanisation.

Main cast
Ada Choi as Yan Fuk
Steven Ma as Cho Chik
Moses Chan as Cho Pei
Mak Cheung-ching as Cho Cheung
Lau Dan as Cho Cho
Sonija Kwok as Kwok Yun

Other cast
Felix Lok as Sun Yuk
Chuk Man-kwan as So Choi-yuk
Irene Wong as Chui Fau
Priscilla Ku as Lau Sik-sik
Gilbert Lam as Yeung Sau
Lam King-kong as Ting Yi
June Chan as Yau-sin
May Kwong as Song-yau
Ching Hor-wai as Lady Bin
Michelle Fung as Lady Wong
Wong Wai-leung as Yan Yim
Fung So-bor as Lady Cheung
John Tang as Cho Jui
Chang Tse-sheng as Sze-ma Yi
Wah Chung-nam as Tsui Fong
Lee Ka-ting as Ha-hau Yun
Homer Cheung as Yu Kam
Ngai Wai-man as Sze-ma Long
Wong Wai-tak as Ka Hui
Robert Siu as Wah Yam
Lee Lung-kei as San Pei
Lily Li as Lady San
Mak Ka-lun as Emperor Hin

List of featured songs
All the songs were composed by Joseph Koo while Chan Siu Kei provided the lyrics.

Shui Chung Sin (水中仙; Water Goddess) - the opening theme song performed by Steven Ma
Lau Sa (流沙; Quicksand) - the ending theme song performed by Steven Ma and Rain Li
Sik Fa (惜花; Cherish the Flower) - insert song performed by Priscilla Ku

Awards and nominations
TVB Anniversary Awards (2002)
 My Favourite Character (Steven Ma)
 My Favourite Character (Ada Choi)
 Most Improved Male Artiste (Moses Chan)
 Nominated: Best Actor (Steven Ma) - Top 5
 Nominated: Best Actress (Ada Choi) - Top 5

See also
 God of River Lok
 List of media adaptations of Romance of the Three Kingdoms

External links
 
  Where the Legend Begins official page on TVB's website

2002 Hong Kong television series debuts
2002 Hong Kong television series endings
TVB dramas
Works based on Romance of the Three Kingdoms
Television series set in the Three Kingdoms